Brzostkow may refer to either of the following places in Poland:
Brzostków, west-central Poland
Brzóstków, south-central Poland